Kelvin Yu (born 1979) is an American actor and writer.

Early life and education
Yu was born to Yu Ming-chuan and Lin Ling-juan. He grew up in Los Angeles, where he currently resides. He is a graduate of the University of California, Los Angeles majoring in Film, Theatre, and Television. His brother, Charles Yu, is a writer.

Career

Acting
Yu started acting in theater at the age of thirteen. His television credits have included guest spots on Frasier, ER, Las Vegas, Without a Trace, Studio 60 on the Sunset Strip, CSI: NY, and Bones.

Yu's first film was the 2003 comedy The Utopian Society. He later made an uncredited appearance in the 2005 film Elizabethtown. The following year, Yu had a supporting role in the comedy Grandma's Boy. Yu played a role in Ghost Whisperer in episode Double Exposure (3x6) as Joseph. Yu had a supporting role in the 2008 Academy Award-winning biographical political drama Milk.

Yu has starred in several short films, including 2006's My Prince, My Angel. Yu later appeared with Linda Park on the ABC series Women's Murder Club, and a lead role in the 2007 short film Fortune Hunters. In 2020, he played a role in Wonder Woman 1984.

Yu had a recurring role in the Netflix original series Master of None as the character of Brian Chang, the on-screen analogue of the show's creator Alan Yang, described as a "hottie" by Vulture magazine.

He provides the voice of a minor character on The Great North. In 2022 Yu appeared in the Apple TV+ series The Afterparty.

Writing 
Kelvin is currently a writer and executive producer for the Fox animated series Bob's Burgers, has been nominated six times for an Emmy Award for Outstanding Animated Program, winning in 2017. In 2016, he won an Annie Award for Outstanding Achievement in Writing in an Animated TV/Broadcast Production (along with co-writer Steven Davis) for the episode "The Hauntening." Yu also is a consulting producer on Central Park and has written a few songs for that show.

In October 2021, it was announced that Disney+ had given a series order to a television adaptation of graphic novel, American Born Chinese. It will be produced by 20th Century Television with Yu and his brother Charles Yu as writers and executive producers, Marvin Mar and Jake Kasdan as executive producers, and Destin Daniel Cretton as director and executive producer.

Filmography

Film

Television

References

External links 

American people of Taiwanese descent
Living people
UCLA Film School alumni
Place of birth missing (living people)
Male actors from Los Angeles
1979 births
American male television writers
Primetime Emmy Award winners
Annie Award winners